Mark Warren Hannaford (February 7, 1925 – June 2, 1985) was an American educator and World War II veteran who served two terms as a U.S. Representative from California from 1975 to 1979.

Biography 
Born in Woodrow, Colorado, Hannaford attended public schools in Anderson, Indiana.
B.A., Ball State University, Muncie, Indiana, 1950.
M.A., same university, 1956.
He attended Yale University under John Hay Fellowship from 1961 to 1962.
He served as associate professor of political science, Long Beach (California) City College from 1966 to 1975.

World War II
He served in the United States Army Air Corps during World War II, serving four years in total from 1943 to 1946.

Political career
Lakewood (California) city councilman from 1966 to 1974.
He served as mayor of Lakewood from 1968 to 1970 from 1972 to 1974.
He served as member of the California State Democratic Central committee from 1966 to 1974.
He served as delegate to Democratic National Convention, 1968.

Congress 
Hannaford was elected as a Democrat to the Ninety-fourth and to the Ninety-fifth Congresses (January 3, 1975 – January 3, 1979).
He was an unsuccessful candidate for reelection in 1978 to the Ninety-sixth Congress.
He was an unsuccessful candidate for nomination in 1980 to the Ninety-seventh Congress.

Death
He was a resident of Lakewood, Calif, until his death there on June 2, 1985.

References

External links

 

1925 births
1985 deaths
Ball State University alumni
Yale University alumni
Democratic Party members of the United States House of Representatives from California
United States Army Air Forces soldiers
Mayors of places in California
20th-century American politicians